Israel Castro (born 1980) is a Mexican football player.

Israel Castro may also refer to:

 Shorty Castro or Israel Castro Vélez (1928–2018), a Puerto Rican comedian
 Israel Castro Franco (born 1975), a Brazilian-Salvadoran football player

See also 
 Castro (surname)